Paria quadriguttata, the willow parium, is a species of leaf beetle. It is found in Central America and North America.

References

Further reading

 

Eumolpinae
Articles created by Qbugbot
Beetles described in 1858
Taxa named by John Lawrence LeConte
Beetles of North America